The exploration of the Americas includes:

Exploration of North America
Age of Discovery#Exploring North America
Timeline of the European colonization of North America
Colonial history of the United States

Exploration of South America
Age of Discovery#Inland Spanish expeditions (1519–1532)

European colonization of the Americas
Voyages of Christopher Columbus

Americas
Americas
Early modern period